Esentepe Spor Kulübü is a Turkish Cypriot sports club based in Esentepe, Kyrenia. The club currently plays in the Süper Lig, having earned promotion at the end of the 2017–2018 season. Esentepe is renowned for its youth team.

Colors
The club colors are red and white.

Stadium
The club's home stadium is Erdal Barut Esentepe Stadı.

Football clubs in Northern Cyprus
Association football clubs established in 1970